The Lahu National Development Party (abbreviated LNDP), sometimes spelled La Hu National Development Party (LHNDP), is a minor political party in Myanmar (Burma).

The party contested the 1990 general election, and one candidate, Deinel Aung, won a seat in the Pyithu Hluttaw, representing Mongping Township, Shan State. However, his victory was not recognized by the military, which seized power shortly after the elections.

The party was registered again on 29 April 2010 to contest the 2010 general election.

References

Political parties in Myanmar
Political parties established in 1990
1990 establishments in Myanmar